

Total statistics

Statistics by country

Statistics by competition

UEFA Cup Winners' Cup / European Cup Winners' Cup

UEFA Europa League / UEFA Cup

UEFA Intertoto Cup

FC Progresul Bucureşti
Romanian football clubs in international competitions